Vinck is a Dutch surname most common in East Flanders. An archaic spelling of the Dutch word for (chaf)finch, it is a variant form of the surname Vink.  Notable people with the surname include:

A.J. Han Vinck (born 1949), Dutch information theorist
Abraham Vinck (1574/1575–1619), Flemish painter and art dealer 
Antoine de Vinck (1924–1992), Belgian ceramist, designer and sculptor
Christian Vinck (born 1975), German tennis player
Franz Vinck (1827–1903), Belgian painter
Jonas Vinck (born 1995), Belgian football defender
Karel Vinck (born 1938), Belgian businessman
Marie Vinck (born 1983), Belgian actress and voice actress

References

Dutch-language surnames
Occupational surnames